Paradise Lakes are a set of three small freshwater lakes located on a clif of the north skirt of Bare Mountain, in King County, Washington. Paradise Lakes sit in a bowl formed by a ridge that connects to the south ridge of Lennox Mountain. Paradise Lakes have an outflow that is a tributary of the North Fork of the Snoqualmie River from its source, Lake Kanim.

Waterfalls 

See also 
 List of lakes of the Alpine Lakes Wilderness

References 

Lakes of King County, Washington
Lakes of the Alpine Lakes Wilderness
Okanogan National Forest